This is the discography of pop group Les Humphries Singers.

Albums

Studio albums

As the Les Humphries Singers

Other studio albums

Live albums

Compilation albums

Box sets

Singles

Notes

References

Pop music group discographies